Ursula J. Gibson is a professor of physics at the Norwegian University of Science and Technology who specialises in novel core optical fibres. Gibson was the president of The Optical Society in 2019.

Early life and education 
Gibson was born in Sheffield, England, and moved to the US in the 1960s, living in the Philadelphia area, then Ithaca, New York.  She received in A.B. in physics from Dartmouth College. She received her M.Sc. and Ph.D. from Cornell University under the supervision of Robert Buhrman in 1978 and 1982, respectively.  Her graduate research was in the area of thin film composites. During her doctoral work she held a Bell Laboratories Graduate Research Program for Women grant, and spent two summers working at Bell Labs.

Research and career 
After her PhD, Gibson joined the faculty of the University of Arizona, working in the Optical Sciences Center, and was promoted to associate professor. In 1990 Gibson returned to Dartmouth College, joining the faculty of the Thayer School of Engineering. Here she taught materials science and nanotechnology, participating in interdisciplinary efforts with chemists at Dartmouth and biologists in the Norris Cotton Cancer Center. She was elected to the board of directors of The Optical Society in 2002. 

Gibson joined the Norwegian University of Science and Technology (NTNU) in 2010.  She was elected to the International Commission on Optics Bureau in 2011. In addition to the NTNU appointment, she is currently an adjunct professor at Clemson University and the KTH Royal Institute of Technology.

Gibson's research on optical materials has been wide-ranging, including polymers, protein crystals and semiconductors, with an emphasis on limited dimension structures such as thin films and waveguides.  She holds three patents and has authored 7 book contributions and over 100 refereed journal articles with over 3500 citations.  Prof. Gibson's present research is focused on semiconductor-core optical fibers.

Gibson works on optical materials and nanostructures, with a focus on photovoltaic cells.
In particular, she is developing optical fibres with cores made from group IV and III-V semiconductors. The semiconductor core materials have nonlinear optical and electro-optic properties, and can be produced in bulk quantities. The fibres have low thermal mass and large aspect ratios, which allows laser heat treatment resulting in recrystallization of the semiconductor and spatial homogenization or segregation of the constituents in alloy materials. The laser treatment was used by Gibson to write structures of  germanium-rich material in crystalline SiGe core fibres. Rapid directional cooling allows the mixture to form a single crystal, which is optimal for optical transmission, and has superior mechanical properties.  Together with physicist Zahra Ghadyani, Gibson founded the company NorFib to commercialize a fiber-based system for generating electricity with solar energy.

In 2017 she was elected to Academia Net by the Swedish Research Council.  Gibson served as the 2019 president of The Optical Society.

Gibson has held visiting positions at the United States Air Force Academy, NASA's Marshall Space Flight Center, Tampere University of Technology (Finland), Chalmers University (Sweden), and the University of Queensland (Australia), among others. She has served as a consultant for many enterprises, including Kodak Inc., the US Department of Defense and the American University of Kuwait.

Awards and honours 
1997 NASA/American Society for Engineering Education Visiting Research Fellow
2001 National Academy of Engineering Frontiers in Engineering
2004 NASA Network of Educator Astronaut Teachers
2008 Fulbright Fellow at VTT Technical Research Centre of Finland
2018 Fellow of The Optical Society
2019 President of The Optical Society

Personal life 
Gibson is married to Ulf Österberg of the Thayer School of Engineering; they have three children.

References 

Dartmouth College alumni
Cornell University alumni
American women physicists
Academic staff of the Norwegian University of Science and Technology
University of Arizona faculty
Living people
Year of birth missing (living people)
Fellows of Optica (society)
Women in optics
American women academics
21st-century American women